Sohrab Rahimi (December 20, 1962 – February 11, 2016), was an Iranian poet, born in Shahrekord, Iran. He has written five books in Persian and  two books in Swedish. He has also translated Persian poetry.

Rahimi's poems have been translated into various languages. Rahimi died in Sweden on February 11, 2016 at the age of 53. He was married to Azita Ghahreman.

Books 
The House of Dreams (Persian), 1995
The Spoiled Kernels of Time (Persian) 1996
White balsam (Persian and Swedish) 2000
A letter to you (Persian), 2006
The geometric drawing of melancholia, (poetry in Persian), 2011 
The librarian of the war (novel in Swedish), 2011
 The inevitable journey (poetry in Swedish), 2012
 Compulsive seasons (poetry in Persian), 2012

Awards 
  2013* Nikolaj Gogols Prize,  Ukraina – specialprize

References

External links
 Sohrab Rahimi

1962 births
2016 deaths
20th-century Iranian poets
Iranian emigrants to Sweden
21st-century Iranian poets